Ayrılık Çeşmesi railway station is situated along the newly built Trans-Bosphorus Marmaray tunnel. The station is located right outside the Asian portal of the tunnel and is the current eastern terminus of the line. The TCDD Taşımacılık operates commuter trains from Ayrılık Çeşmesi to Kazlıçeşme within 6- to 10-minute intervals. Connection to the M4 station of the Istanbul Metro is available.

Ayrılık Çeşmesi saw over 1.5 million boardings in October 2017, making it the second busiest station on the Marmaray line and constituting for 26% of all passenger boardings.

Layout

Equipment
The railway station features following equipment:
 2 entrance and exit gates,
 4 escalators,
 1 elevator,
 1 ticket office,
 2 ticket vending machines,
 1 credit loading machine for electronic tickets,
 14 turnstiles including 2 for physically handicapped people and
 10 passenger information screens.

References

Marmaray
Railway stations in Istanbul Province
Railway stations opened in 2013
2013 establishments in Turkey
Transport in Kadıköy